Bronowo may refer to:

Bronowo, Podlaskie Voivodeship (north-east Poland)
Bronowo, Nowy Dwór Gdański County in Pomeranian Voivodeship (north Poland)
Bronowo, Słupsk County in Pomeranian Voivodeship (north Poland)
Bronowo, Warmian-Masurian Voivodeship (north Poland)
Bronowo, West Pomeranian Voivodeship (north-west Poland)